Oluklu  is a village  in the Selim district of Kars Province, Turkey. The population of Oluklu is 1574 as of 2011. Up to 2011 Oluklu was a village in Kağızman district. But it was closer to Selim and hence in April 2011, it the province council decided to change the administrative status of Oluklu which disappointed Kağızman residents.

References

Populated places in Kars Province
Towns in Turkey
Selim District